Charles Robert Hamilton Sr. (May 29, 1957 – January 7, 2007) was an American stock car racing driver. A driver and owner in the NASCAR Craftsman Truck Series circuit and the winner of the 2004 NASCAR Craftsman Truck Series championship, Hamilton owned Bobby Hamilton Racing. Hamilton's son, Bobby Hamilton Jr., is also a NASCAR driver.

Hamilton may be best remembered for two of his Winston Cup Series wins. His first career victory at the 1996 Dura Lube 500 at Phoenix was the first win for the No. 43 Petty car since Richard Petty's last win in 1984. He also had a memorable win at the Talladega 500 in April 2001 driving the No. 55 car for owner Andy Petree. The entire 500-mile race was run caution-free and was under intense scrutiny from both NASCAR and the media at large, being the first superspeedway race run since the death of Dale Earnhardt at the 2001 Daytona 500 two months earlier. A physically and mentally exhausted Hamilton slumped to the ground after exiting his car and was given oxygen from a tank before giving the standard post-race Victory Lane interview while sitting on the ground, leaning against the drivers door.

Early life
Born in Nashville, Tennessee, Hamilton lost his custodial parents to illness when he was thirteen years old (Grandfather Preacher Hamilton, car builder and crew chief for Marty Robbins at the old Nashville Fairgrounds Speedway, and Grandmother Annie Mae Hamilton) who had raised him from early childhood. Hamilton quit school at the age of fourteen and began his racing career at Nashville Speedway USA, now Fairgrounds Speedway, racing on the weekly circuit at the legendary track, where he won back to back Late Model Stock Car Championships in 1987 and 1988. In 1988 Hamilton won an unprecedented four races, in three different divisions, in one night, at Nashville Fairground Speedway. Hamilton began to be noticed within the NASCAR ranks after racing in a special four-car "Superstar Showdown" at Nashville in 1988 against Cup Series drivers Sterling Marlin, Darrell Waltrip, and Bill Elliott.

NASCAR career

Days of Thunder
Hamilton broke into the Winston Cup ranks in a very unusual way. He was asked to drive one of the "movie cars" for the 1990 film Days of Thunder, qualifying fifth in a movie car at the 1989 Autoworks 500 in Phoenix, in a car that was not intended to be competitive. The car was the No. 51 Exxon-sponsored machine, portrayed in the movie as being driven by the character Rowdy Burns.

1988–1994 
Hamilton made his NASCAR debut in the Busch Series in 1988 at Charlotte Motor Speedway driving the No. 16 Filmar Racing Chevrolet, finishing 14th. He competed in the next race at Rockingham and finished 20th. He drove full-time in the Busch Series in 1989 driving the No. 8 Lighting & Fans-sponsored Buick for FILMAR Racing, finishing 11th in points, and winning his only career Busch race at Richmond International Raceway. He made his Winston Cup debut in a "Days of Thunder" car owned by Hendrick Motorsports. He led five laps but finished 32nd after an engine failure. He matched his 11th-place points finish in 1990 with Filmar Racing, when he was picked up by Tri-star Motorsports to run Winston Cup full-time beginning in 1991, driving the No. 68 Country Time Lemonade-sponsored Oldsmobile, posting four Top 10 finishes and narrowly defeating Ted Musgrave for Rookie of the Year.

In 1992, he had two Top 10s and finished 25th in points. He began 1993 with Tri-Star but was released early in the season. He spent the rest of the season in the Cup and Busch Series, posting two Top 10s for Akins-Sutton Motorsports. Hamilton also made five Busch Series starts in the No. 05 Key Motorsports Chevrolet. In 1994, he joined SABCO Racing to driving the No. 40 Kendall Motor Oil-sponsored Pontiac Grand Prix. He had just one Top 10 finish and left at the end of the season.

1995–2002 

For the 1995 season, Hamilton moved to Petty Enterprises to drive the No. 43 STP-sponsored Pontiac. He posted 10 Top 10s and moved up to 14th in the final standings. The next season, he finished a career-best ninth in the points standings and won his first race at Phoenix, the first for Petty Enterprises since 1983. He also formed his own Craftsman Truck Series team and began competing in the series part-time. He won at Rockingham in 1997, but departed the team after falling to 16th in points.

He then signed with Morgan-McClure Motorsports in 1998 and in their eighth race together, he won from the pole, leading 378 of 500 laps at Martinsville Speedway. He ended the season, finishing 10th in the points. He had another ten Top 10 finish in 2000 and finished that season off 30th in points. He left for Andy Petree Racing to drive the No. 55 Square D-sponsored Chevy. He won his final Cup career race at Talladega and finished 18th in points. He posted three Top 10s in 2002 but suffered a broken shoulder late in the season, causing him to miss several races.

Although his Cup Series run in 2000 was not successful, he made history regardless as he joined Ken Schrader, Terry Labonte, and Mark Martin as one of the drivers to, at that point, win a race in each of NASCAR's Top 3 series when he won a Craftsman Truck Series race at Martinsville.

Craftsman Truck Series 

Due to the injury, as well as an unstable financial situation at Petree Racing, Hamilton left the Winston Cup Series for the Truck Series driving for his own team, taking the Square D sponsorship with him. Driving the No. 4 Dana Dodge Ram Hamilton picked up two wins in his first year on the circuit and finished sixth in points. The following season, he picked up four wins and clinched the championship, marking the first time since Alan Kulwicki's championship in 1992 that an owner-driver won a NASCAR championship. He switched to the No. 04 in 2005.

In 2005, he started his Truck series season with a bizarre finish. He led the final laps of the 2005 Dodge Dealers 250 at Daytona International Speedway when Jimmy Spencer got by with a few laps left and the white flag flew just before a crash occurred in turn 1. During the accident, Hamilton passed Spencer for the lead. Due to the scoring-loop rules, before the accident it was initially believed that Spencer won. Spencer drove to victory circle, but not long afterward it was determined that Hamilton won; Hamilton was at the final scoring loop as he was in the lead.

Hamilton later won at Mansfield and went on his way to another sixth-place points finish.

He drove the No. 18 Fastenal Dodge for three races in 2006, but was diagnosed with cancer and never raced again, with his son finishing out the season.

Illness and death
On March 17, 2006, Hamilton announced that he had been diagnosed with head and neck cancer. He took part in the Craftsman Truck Series race that night, before starting therapy the following Monday.

Kyle Busch paid tribute to Hamilton two months later for the Truck race at Lowe's Motor Speedway by driving a truck painted to resemble the Rowdy Burns car in Days of Thunder, complete with the No. 51 and "Rowdy" decals, a tribute that Busch continues today in late model and truck racing.

Hamilton returned to the track for the race at Kentucky Speedway, overseeing his team's operations. Knowing he would not be well enough to drive in 2007, he hired Ken Schrader to drive his No. 18 Fastenal-sponsored Dodge for the full 2007 schedule while Hamilton continued his cancer treatment. Hamilton died on January 7, 2007, at his home in Mt. Juliet, Tennessee, with his family by his side.

Motorsports career results

NASCAR
(key) (Bold – Pole position awarded by qualifying time. Italics – Pole position earned by points standings or practice time. * – Most laps led.)

Cup Series

Daytona 500

Busch Series

Craftsman Truck Series

International Race of Champions
(key) (Bold – Pole position. * – Most laps led.)

References

Bobby Hamilton at racing-reference.info
Even with cancer battle, Hamilton still has grit
Hamilton Racing To Recovery

External links

Official Website
 
 

1957 births
2007 deaths
Sportspeople from Nashville, Tennessee
Racing drivers from Nashville, Tennessee
Racing drivers from Tennessee
NASCAR drivers
American Speed Association drivers
International Race of Champions drivers
NASCAR Truck Series champions
NASCAR team owners
Deaths from cancer in Tennessee
Deaths from throat cancer
Burials in Tennessee
Hendrick Motorsports drivers